Unión Deportiva Tijarafe is a football team based in Tijarafe, in the Canary Islands. Founded in 1975, it plays in the Tercera División - Group 12. Its stadium is Estadio Municipal with a capacity of 1,500 seats.

Season to season

4 seasons in Tercera División

External links
Official website 
Futbolme team profile 

Football clubs in the Canary Islands
Sport in La Palma
Association football clubs established in 1975
1975 establishments in Spain